Takenoko-zoku (竹の子族, lit. "bamboo shoot tribe") describes a type of dance group active from the mid-1970s to the mid-1980s in Tokyo, especially in Harajuku. The teenagers, mainly girls but often with one boy leading, were colorfully dressed and danced in a distinctive style on the sidewalk to music from stereos.  To an extent, they were precursors to the gyaru groups that would eventually arise in the 90s.

A performance of a takenoko-zoku group can be seen in Chris Marker's film Sans Soleil.

Notes

External links

 Takenoko-zoku photos

Performing arts in Japan
Shibuya